was a Japanese speed skater. He competed in four events at the 1936 Winter Olympics.

References

1912 births
1968 deaths
Japanese male speed skaters
Olympic speed skaters of Japan
Speed skaters at the 1936 Winter Olympics
Place of birth missing